Jan Gottfrid Klenberg (22 October 1931 – 28 August 2020) was a Finnish admiral. He was born in Mikkeli. He served as Chief of Defence of the Finnish Defence Forces. Klenberg was the first navy officer in that position.

References

External links
 The Finnish Defence Forces: Chiefs of Defence 
 Klenberg, Jan at Biografiskt lexikon för Finland (in Swedish)

1931 births
2020 deaths
People from Mikkeli
Chiefs of Staff (Finnish Defence Forces)
Finnish admirals
Recipients of the Military Order of the Cross of the Eagle, Class I